Talari Networks is a San Jose, CA-based manufacturer of networking equipment that allows businesses to combine private wide area networks (WANs) with less expensive broadband connections such as DSL or cable. It was founded in 2007 and launched its initial beta product in early 2008. The company was acquired by Oracle Corporation in 2018.

History
Talari Networks was founded in 2007 by Andy Gottlieb and John Dickey, former colleagues at Applied Micro.  Gottlieb became the company’s first CEO, and Dickey became Vice President of Engineering. The company launched its initial beta product in early 2008.  Mark Masur was then named CEO of Talari. In 2017 Dell veteran, Patrick Sweeney, was named CEO.

On November 15, 2018, Oracle Corporation announced that it had agreed to acquire Talari Networks. The transaction was expected to close by the end of 2018.

References

External links
 

Companies based in San Jose, California
Technology companies based in the San Francisco Bay Area
Networking companies of the United States
Networking hardware companies
Telecommunications equipment vendors
Telecommunications companies established in 2007
Oracle acquisitions
2018 mergers and acquisitions